Mazax is a genus of corinnid sac spiders first described by O. Pickard-Cambridge in 1898.

Species
 it contains seven species from the Americas and the Caribbean:
Mazax ajax Reiskind, 1969 – Mexico
Mazax chickeringi Reiskind, 1969 – Jamaica
Mazax kaspari Cokendolpher, 1978 – USA
Mazax pax Reiskind, 1969 (type) – USA to Panama
Mazax ramirezi Rubio & Danişman, 2014 – Argentina
Mazax spinosa (Simon, 1898) – Central America, Lesser Antilles
Mazax xerxes Reiskind, 1969 – Costa Rica

References

Araneomorphae genera
Corinnidae
Spiders of Argentina
Spiders of North America